Wallner is a surname. It is common in Austria, on its own or in longer names, for example "Haubenwallner". Sometimes it is referred to as a variant of the German name "Waldner". Notable people with the surname include:

Anna Wallner (born 1969), Canadian television host
Erika Wallner (1941-2016), Argentine actress
Fred Wallner, American football player
Hans Wallner, Austrian ski jumper
Johan Wallner (born 1965), Swedish skier
Manuel Wallner (born 1988), Austrian footballer
Marina Wallner, German skier
Mary Jane Wallner (born 1946), American politician 
Matt Wallner (born 1997), American baseball player
Roman Wallner (born 1982), Austrian football player
Valentina Wallner (born 1990), Swedish ice hockey player

German-language surnames